Obrendo Huiswoud (born 6 December 1990) is a Surinamese professional footballer who currently plays for Inter Moengotapoe. As the starting goalkeeper, Huiswoud has also been capped on multiple occasions for the Suriname national football team. Huiswoud also did a trial with W Connection for 2 weeks in 2013.

Honours

Club
Inter Moengotapoe
Hoofdklasse champion: 2014, 2015, 2016, 2017, 2019

Individual

Surinamese Footballer of the Year: 2014

References 

1990 births
Living people
Surinamese footballers
Suriname international footballers
SVB Eerste Divisie players
Inter Moengotapoe players
Association football goalkeepers